The UK R&B Chart is a weekly chart that ranks the 40 biggest-selling singles and albums that are classified in the R&B genre in the United Kingdom. The chart is compiled by the Official Charts Company, and is based on physical formats. This is a list of the UK's biggest R&B hits of 2001  but erroneously includes tracks from other genres, for example Eminem (Hip hop), Shaggy (Dancehall) and Daniel Bedingfield (UK Garage).

Number ones

See also
List of UK Dance Singles Chart number ones of 2001
List of UK Independent Singles Chart number ones of 2001
List of UK Rock & Metal Singles Chart number ones of 2001
List of UK R&B Albums Chart number ones of 2001

References

United Kindgom RandB Singles
2001
2001 in British music